James Hamilton, 2nd Marquess of Hamilton and 4th Earl of Arran KG PC (1589 – 2 March 1625), styled Lord Aven from 1599 to 1604, was a Scottish politician. He was the son of John Hamilton, 1st Marquess of Hamilton and Margaret Lyon.

Career
Hamilton inherited his father's titles and estates in 1604. King James granted him the property and lands of Arbroath Abbey, or  "Aberbrothwick", and on 5 May 1608 created him Lord Aberbrothwick. In 1609, Aberbrothwick inherited the earldom of Arran from his insane and childless uncle James Hamilton.

He moved to England with King James, and invested in the Somers Isles Company, an offshoot of the Virginia company, buying the shares of Lucy Harrington, Countess of Bedford. The Parish of Hamilton in the Somers Isles (alias Bermuda) is named for him. He was created Earl of Cambridge and Baron of Innerdale in the peerage of England on 16 June 1619. In 1621 he served as Lord High Commissioner to the Parliament of Scotland, the King's representative in the Parliament of Scotland.

Marriage and children

In 1603, he married Lady Ann Cunningham, a daughter of James Cunningham, 7th Earl of Glencairn and they had five children:
Lady Anne Hamilton, married Hugh Montgomerie, 7th Earl of Eglinton and had issue
Lady Margaret Hamilton, married John Lindsay, 17th Earl of Crawford, 1st Earl of Lindsay and had issue
Lady Mary Hamilton (died 1633), married James Douglas, 2nd Earl of Queensberry, no issue
James Hamilton, 1st Duke of Hamilton (1606–1649)
William Hamilton, 2nd Duke of Hamilton (1616–1651)

He also had an illegitimate daughter, Margaret (who married John Hamilton, 1st Lord Belhaven and Stenton and had issue) by Anne Stewart, a daughter of Walter Stewart, 1st Lord Blantyre.

Hamilton died on 2 March 1625 at Whitehall, London, from a fever and was buried in the family mausoleum at Hamilton, on 2 September of that year.

Ancestry

References

Biography

Hamilton, James Hamilton, 2nd Marquess of
Hamilton, James Hamilton, 2nd Marquess of
Hamilton, James Hamilton, 2nd Marquess of
17th-century Scottish peers
Hamilton, James Hamilton, 2nd Marquess of
Members of the Parliament of Scotland 1612
Members of the Convention of the Estates of Scotland 1617
Members of the Parliament of Scotland 1617
Members of the Parliament of Scotland 1621
James
Earls of Cambridge
James
Earls of Arran